"Leave Home" is a song by English big beat duo the Chemical Brothers. It was the first single released from their debut album Exit Planet Dust in 1995. It reached number 17 on the UK Singles Chart.

Background 
It was used in the soundtracks to the video games SSX 3 and Wipeout 2097, and is also featured in the video game DJ Hero 2. The song was featured in the 2000 movies Gone in 60 Seconds and High Fidelity, as well as the 1997 film Dangerous Ground, the 1998 film The Acid House, the 1999 film Any Given Sunday and in episodes of The Real Hustle.

The song originally appeared on the duo's first mix album, NME Xmas Dust Up, which was produced for the NME and covermount into their Christmas 1994 issue. This was when the duo were still known as the Dust Brothers.

The recurring lyric "the brother's gonna work it out" later led to the name of their 1998 mix album of the same name.

Track listing 
 CD
 UK, Europe, and US release
 "Leave Home" – 5:33
 "Leave Home" (Underworld mix) – 6:47
 "Leave Home" (Sabres of Paradise mix) – 5:36

 US release (ASW 6167-2)
 "Leave Home" – 5:33
 "Leave Home" (Underworld mix one) – 8:52
 "Leave Home" (Underworld mix two) – 6:46
 "Leave Home" (Sabres of Paradise mix) – 5:37

 Japan release
 "Leave Home" – 5:33
 "Leave Home" (Underworld mix I) – 8:53
 "Leave Home" (Sabres of Paradise mix) – 5:36
 "Life Is Sweet" – 6:33
 "Life Is Sweet" (Daft Punk remix) – 8:37
 "If You Kling to Me I'll Klong You" – 5:24

 12-inch vinyl
 UK version one
 "Leave Home" – 5:33
 "Leave Home" (Sabres of Paradise mix) – 5:36
 "Let Me in Mate" – 4:21

 UK version two
 "Leave Home" (Underworld mix II) – 8:53
 "Leave Home" (Underworld mix) – 6:47

Charts

References 

1995 singles
1995 songs
The Chemical Brothers songs
Virgin Records singles
Astralwerks singles
Songs written by Tom Rowlands
Songs written by Ed Simons